Jesús Mariano Angoy Gil (born 22 May 1966) is a Spanish retired association football goalkeeper, who also played as a placekicker in American football.

He appeared in nine La Liga matches for his main club Barcelona over five seasons, being mostly third-choice. He has been diagnosed with Parkinson in November 2022.

Football
Born in Alagón, Zaragoza, Angoy was a product of FC Barcelona's youth ranks. He made his professional debut with CD Logroñés however, and, already well in his 20s, spent several seasons with the Catalans' B-team, playing three years in the second division.

After the departure of legendary Andoni Zubizarreta and prior to the arrival of Vítor Baía, Angoy profited from some injuries to first-choice Carles Busquets to appear in nine La Liga matches. As the 1995–96 campaign drew to a close, both him and manager Johan Cruyff (whose daughter was married to the player) left the club; after an unassuming spell at Córdoba CF, he retired from football.

American football
Angoy spent seven years (1996–2003) at NFL Europe side Barcelona Dragons's kicker, then switched to Italy with the Bergamo Lions (IFL). In 1999, he had an unsuccessful trial with the Denver Broncos, the reigning champions of the National Football League.

Three years later, Angoy was selected to NFL Europe's All-Offensive team.

References

External links

1966 births
Living people
Sportspeople from the Province of Zaragoza
Spanish footballers
Footballers from Aragon
Association football goalkeepers
La Liga players
Segunda División players
Segunda División B players
FC Barcelona C players
FC Barcelona Atlètic players
CD Logroñés footballers
FC Barcelona players
Córdoba CF players
Spanish players of American football
Barcelona Dragons players
Footballers who switched code
Spanish expatriate sportspeople in Italy